Shesha Drushti is a 1997 Indian Odia-language film directed by Apurba Kishore Bir, which deals with the disillusionment of a dying freedom fighter who has to bribe a government official to get his son a job.

Synopsis 
Kedar Babu is a freedom fighter since the days of Gandhiji's call for the Civil Disobedience Movement. Kedar Babu has lost his wife at an early stage of his marriage. Since then, he has brought up his only son Sangram with all paternal affection. In the town, Sangram stays in the house of a Zamindar Bahudur Surriyakant Singh. During his stay in the Zamindar's house, Sangram experiences the gradual moral setback of a feudal system and the irresponsible and unethical practices in the library. This puts him in a state of dilemma and delusion. In the last moment encounter with his father, Sangram experiences a new perception to life, illuminated with anxiety, suspicion, shock, tragedy, dilemma, wilderness, and the thrill of fulfilling the last wish of his father by enacting the childhood spirit of attaining freedom and subsequently a new vision.

Cast
Sarat Pujari as Zamindar Bahudur Surriyakant Singh.
Neeraj Kabi as Sangram
Neelam Mukherjee

Music 
Bhavdeep Jaipurwale  has arranged music for this film

Awards & Participation 
National Film Awards(1998) -Best Feature film In Odia
Singapore Film Festival
International Film Festival of India (1998)
Pyongyang International Film Festival (1998)

References

External links
Film Data Base of Shesha Drushti in www.nfdcindia.com
Review of Shesha Drushti in movies.nytimes.com
Review of Shesha Drushti in www.geocities.com
 

1997 films
1990s Odia-language films
National Film Development Corporation of India films
Films directed by Apurba Kishore Bir